Polyommatus icadius  is a  butterfly found in the  East Palearctic  that belongs to the blues family.

Subspecies
P. i. icadius Pamirs
P. i. morkeleb  Korb, 2000     Darvaz
P. i. candidus   Zhdanko, 2000      Tian-Shan
P. i. cicero  Ivonin & Kosterin, 2000     South Altai
P. i. fominae  Stradomsky, 2005     Caucasia

Taxonomy
Formerly a subspecies of Polyommatus icarus.

Description from Seitz

In ab. icadius [of icarus]  Gr.-Grsh. (80 g) which occurs particularly in Anterior Asia, the borders of the ocelli are almost of the same colour as the ground and therefore scarcely visible, being much too distinct in our figure. The hindwing, moreover, has a slightly different shape in this form, which is perhaps on the way to develop into a local race.

Biology
The larva feeds on Cicer songaricum, Cicer flexuosum

See also
List of butterflies of Russia

References

Polyommatus
Butterflies described in 1890